Ambrosio Kibuuka (1868 – June 3, 1886) was a Ugandan Catholic martyr killed for his faith. He was born in Buganda. He was one of many Christians put to death by King Mwanga II between 1885 and 1887.  His day of martyrdom was June 3, when he was burned alive, and when he is remembered as one of the Martyrs of Uganda's feast day.

References

External links
 Ambrosio Kibuuka bio
The Uganda Martyrs from the August 2008 issue of The Word Among Us magazine
Ambrosio Kibuuka's profile from UgandaMartyrsShrine.org

1868 births
1886 deaths
19th-century Christian saints
19th-century executions by Uganda
19th-century Roman Catholic martyrs
Roman Catholic child saints
Canonizations by Pope Paul VI
Converts to Roman Catholicism from pagan religions
Executed children
Executed Ugandan people
People executed by Buganda
People executed by Uganda by burning
Ugandan Roman Catholic saints